Deem City is a ghost town in Palm Beach County, Florida, United States, located approximately  northwest of Weston on U.S. Route 27, near the Palm Beach/Broward county line.

Geography

References

Unincorporated communities in Palm Beach County, Florida
Unincorporated communities in Florida